M. ferruginea may refer to:
 Malthonica ferruginea, a spider species found in Europe
 Mapania ferruginea a plant species found in Cameroon and São Tomé and Príncipe
 Menziesia ferruginea, the rusty menziesia, a flowering plant species
 Muscicapa ferruginea, the ferruginous flycatcher, a bird species found in Bangladesh and Bhutan
 Myrmeciza ferruginea, the ferruginous-backed antbird, a species of bird found in Brazil and French Guiana

Synonyms
 Macalla ferruginea, a synonym for Salma pyrastis, a moth species found in the south eastern quarter of Australia
 Mesua ferruginea, a synonym for Kayea ferruginea, a plant species

See also
 Ferruginea (disambiguation)